FGI-104 is the name of an experimental broad-spectrum antiviral drug, with activity against a range of viruses including hepatitis B, hepatitis C, HIV, Ebola virus, and Venezuelan equine encephalitis virus.

Mechanism
The drug acts by inhibiting the protein TSG101, which transports newly manufactured virions to the exterior of an infected cell, thus breaking the replication cycle of the virus. In pre-clinical studies, FGI-104 has been shown to protect mice from Ebola virus disease.

See also 
 FGI-103
 FGI-106
 LJ-001

References 

Antiviral drugs
Ebola
Quinolines
Chloroarenes
Phenols
Phenol ethers
Diethylamino compounds
Primary alcohols